Kari Johannes Urpilainen (born 8 May 1951 in Kokkola) is a Finnish politician. He served as a Member of the Parliament of Finland from 1983 to 1995 and again from 1999 to 2003, representing the Social Democratic Party of Finland (SDP). He is the father of Jutta Urpilainen.

References

1951 births
Living people
People from Kokkola
Social Democratic Party of Finland politicians
Members of the Parliament of Finland (1983–87)
Members of the Parliament of Finland (1987–91)
Members of the Parliament of Finland (1991–95)
Members of the Parliament of Finland (1999–2003)